Neocrepidodera corpulenta is a species of flea beetle from Chrysomelidae family that can be found in Albania, Bulgaria, France, Italy, Romania, and in all states of former Yugoslavia.

References

Beetles described in 1860
Beetles of Europe
corpulenta